Burton S. "Burt" Kaliski, Jr. is a cryptographer, who is currently the chief technology officer (CTO) and senior vice president at Verisign. Before joining Verisign in 2011, he was the founding director of the EMC Innovation Network at EMC Corporation since its 2006 acquisition of RSA Security where he was Chief Scientist for RSA Laboratories. His notable work includes the development of such public key cryptography standards as PKCS and IEEE P1363, the extension of linear cryptanalysis to use multiple approximations, and the design of the block cipher Crab.

Kaliski received his B.S., M.S., and Ph.D. degrees in Computer Science from MIT, where his research was on cryptography. He was a visiting assistant professor of Computer Engineering at Rochester Institute of Technology before joining RSA Security.

He was also a guest professor and member of the international advisory board of Peking University,  School of Software and Microelectronics.

References

External links
 Bio: Burt Kaliski, The New Face of Technology Symposium, Georgia Tech College of Computing.
 Profile at the AMS-SIAM Mathematics Careers Bulletin Board (archived 2009)

Living people
Modern cryptographers
Public-key cryptographers
American cryptographers
Computer security academics
MIT School of Engineering alumni
American chief technology officers
Year of birth missing (living people)